Isabelle of Blois or Elizabeth of Blois (died  1248 or 1249) was the lady of Amboise by marriage and from 1218 until her death the countess of Chartres in her own right. She founded three Cistercian houses for nuns. Twice widowed, she was succeeded by her daughter, Matilda.

Family
Isabelle (Elizabeth) was born probably before 1180. She belonged to the highest nobility of France. She was the younger daughter of Count Theobald V of Blois and Chartres and Alice, daughter of King Louis VII and the Duchess Eleanor of Aquitaine. She had a brother, Count Louis I of Blois; an older sister, Margaret; and another sister, Alice, who was the abbess of Fontevraud between 1209 and 1218.

Isabelle was married twice. They had six children: Hugh, Matilda, John, William, Alice and Dionysia. Sometime before 1209, Sulpice and Isabelle jointly founded the Cistercian . When Sulpice died, sometime between 1214 and 1218, Hugh inherited Amboise. He in turn was succeeded by Matilda around 1237. The fates of the four younger children of Isabelle and Sulpice are unknown. Isabelle made several gifts to Moncé for the benefit of Sulpice's soul, including endowing a priest there to say mass daily. In 1218, she married , lord of Montmirail and Oisy. No children of her second marriage are known.

Countess
When Isabelle's nephew, Count Theobald VI, died without heirs in 1218, his counties were divided between his aunts. The initiative to divide them came from King Philip II. Margaret received Blois and Isabelle received Chartres. Her husband, John, paid a feudal relief to the king, who in August confirmed Isabelle's succession to the county and to some associated castellanies with her cousin, Count William II of Perche, standing as surety. In July 1221, William gave Montigny-le-Chartif to his cousin and her heirs.

This foundation lay on the edge of the marshy wilderness known as the Sologne and the nuns were given 36 arpents to bring under cultivation. In 1232, Isabelle's daughter Matilda and her husband, granted the nuns a further 100 arpents rent free if they brought it under cultivation.

Isabelle's charters for Lieu are well preserved in a cartulary compiled in 1269 or 1270, but many of those for Eau were lost in a 16th-century fire. Today, 92 of her charters for Lieu and 35 for Eau survive. Besides her own foundations, Isabelle was generous with other houses favoured by her family.

In 1226, William of Perche died, leaving Isabelle his share of the income from the mills of Chartres for "support of the poor". She gave it to the nunnery at Eau. Isabelle's second husband died in 1238 or 1239. For the sake of his soul, she gave 435 livres tournois as alms for the poor.

In 1241, Isabelle's niece, Countess Mary of Blois, died, leaving her entire estate, including the county of Blois, to her husband, Count Hugh, and Isabelle. Hugh maintained control. In 1247, Isabelle drew up her will, confirming all her previous gifts to Lieu. She also endowed a chapel there for masses to be said daily for her, her family and her cousin, Queen Blanche. In 1248, she bought back property at Saugirard, which her brother had given to the  before 1205, in order to bestow it on the nuns of Lieu.

Isabelle died in 1248 or 1249. She was succeeded by her widowed daughter Matilda.

Notes

Bibliography

1170s births
1240s deaths
Countesses of Chartres
13th-century women rulers